Pygarctia abdominalis, the yellow-edged pygarctia or orange-bodied pygarctia, is a moth in the family Erebidae. It was described by Augustus Radcliffe Grote in 1871. It is found in the United States from New Jersey south to Florida and west to Texas.

The wingspan is about 35 mm for males and 45 mm for females. The forewings are slate gray with pale yellow along the costa and inner margin. Adults are most common from April to August. In Florida, adults have been recorded on wing in February, from April to June and from August to September.

The larvae have been reported feeding on Euphorbiaceae and Apocynaceae species.

References

Arctiidae genus list at Butterflies and Moths of the World of the Natural History Museum

Moths described in 1871
Phaegopterina